is a Japanese former competitive figure skater. He placed 22nd at the 2003 World Junior Figure Skating Championships and 12th at the 2004 NHK Trophy. He was coached by Nobuo Satō.

Programs

Competitive highlights 
GP: Grand Prix; JGP: Junior Grand Prix

References

External links
 

Japanese male single skaters
1985 births
Living people
Sportspeople from Tokyo